NGC 2298 is a globular cluster in the southern constellation of Puppis. Discovered by James Dunlop on May 30, 1826, it is probably a former member of the disputed Canis Major Dwarf galaxy.

The cluster is being disrupted by the galactic tide, trailing a long tidal tail.

References

External links
 
 NGC 2298 at Wikisky
 NGC 2298 at Astrosurf
 NGC 2298 at Deepskypedia
 

Globular clusters
Puppis
2298